Teldeniya(තෙල්දෙණිය) was a town in Kandy District in the Central Province of Sri Lanka. The town was submerged during construction of the Victoria Dam.

See also
List of towns in Central Province, Sri Lanka

External links

Populated places in Kandy District